Stuart Alexander Henderson (September 19, 1863 – February 17, 1945) was a Scottish-born lawyer and political figure in British Columbia. He represented Yale from 1903 to 1909 in the Legislative Assembly of British Columbia as a Liberal.

He was born in Lonmay, Aberdeenshire, the son of William Henderson and Mary Jane Smith. He came to Ontario with his father in 1872 and was educated in Ottawa, at Toronto University and at Osgoode Hall. While in Ontario, he served as a lieutenant in the militia. Henderson was also an Ottawa alderman. He came to British Columbia in 1897 and entered the practice of law there the following year. Henderson was married twice: first to Alice London in 1890 and then to Mary Jane Losh in 1904. He was a director for the Mutual Life Company of Canada. He was defeated when he ran for reelection to the assembly in 1909 and again in Lillooet in 1912. In 1919, Henderson successfully defended Simon Gunanoot against a charge of murder. He died in Victoria at the age of 81.

References 

1863 births
1945 deaths
British Columbia Liberal Party MLAs
Scottish emigrants to Canada
University of Toronto alumni
Osgoode Hall Law School alumni
People from Buchan
Ottawa city councillors